Colombian Communist Party – Maoist (Spanish: Partido Comunista de Colombia - Maoista) is a Colombian Marxist–Leninist–Maoist political party. It was founded by the Communist Organization of Colombia (Marxist–Leninist–Maoist) in July 2001.

The party is a member of the International Coordination of Revolutionary Parties and Organizations.

References

External links
Site of the party (in Spanish) (dead)

2001 establishments in Colombia
Communist parties in Colombia
Far-left politics in Colombia
International Coordination of Revolutionary Parties and Organizations
Maoism in South America
Maoist parties
Political parties established in 2001